A visiting forces agreement (VFA) is an agreement between a country and a foreign nation having military forces visiting in that country. Visiting forces agreements are similar in intent to status of forces agreements (SOFAs).  A VFA typically covers forces visiting temporarily, while a SOFA typically covers forces based in the host nation as well as visiting forces.

Agreements
While the United States military has the largest foreign presence and therefore accounts for most VFAs, other countries having troops temporarily serving abroad negotiate VFAs with states where they serve.

Terms of operation
VFAs are intended to clarify the terms under which foreign military is allowed to operate. Typically, a VFA is mainly concerned with the legal issues associated with military individuals and property. This may include issues like entry and exit into the country, tax liabilities, postal services, or employment terms for host-country nationals, but the most contentious issues are civil and criminal jurisdiction over the visiting forces. For civil matters, VFAs provide for how civil damages caused by the forces will be determined and paid. Criminal issues vary, but the typical provision in U.S. VFAs is that U.S. military courts will have jurisdiction over crimes committed either by a servicemember against another servicemember or by a servicemember as part of his or her military duty, but the host nation retains jurisdiction over other crimes.

Host nation concerns

In many host nations, the VFA can become a major political issue following crimes allegedly committed by visiting service members. This is especially true when the incidents involve severe crimes, such as robbery, murder, manslaughter or sex crimes, especially when the charge is defined differently between the two nations. For example, in 2005 in the Philippines, four U.S. Marines were charged with raping a local woman with whom they had been drinking.  As the incident had no connection with the military duties of the accused, they were tried under Philippine law in a Philippine court, which convicted one of the accused and acquitted the others.

Political issues

The political issue of VFAs is complicated by the fact that many host countries have mixed feelings about foreign troops on their soil, and demands to renegotiate the VFA are often combined with calls for foreign troops to leave entirely. Issues of different national customs can arise. Many U.S. observers, for example, feel that host country justice systems grant a much weaker set of protections to the accused than the U.S. and that host country courts can be subject to popular pressure to deliver a guilty verdict; furthermore, that American servicemembers ordered to a foreign posting should not be forced to give up the rights they are afforded under the United States Bill of Rights. On the other hand, host country observers having no local counterpart to the Bill of Rights often feel that this is an irrelevant excuse for demanding special treatment, and resembles the extraterritorial agreements demanded by Western countries during the colonial era. One host country where such sentiment is widespread, South Korea, itself has forces in Kyrgyzstan and has negotiated a SOFA that confers total immunity to its servicemembers from prosecution by Kyrgyz authorities for any crime whatsoever, something far in excess of the privileges many South Koreans object to in their nation's SOFA with the U.S.

To many U.S. observers, the fact that most accused criminals eventually end up being tried in a local court and found guilty proves that the system is working; to some host country observers, it reinforces the perception that the VFA protects the guilty and makes the exceptions more glaring.

See also
 Status of forces agreement
 Visiting Forces Act
 Philippines–United States Visiting Forces Agreement
 Philippines–Australia Status of Visiting Forces Agreement
 Extraterritoriality

References
Citations

General references
 
 

Military alliances